N'Nhyn Fernander (born 28 July 1998) is a Bahamian swimmer. He competed in the men's 50 metre breaststroke event at the 2017 World Aquatics Championships.

References

1998 births
Living people
Bahamian male swimmers
Place of birth missing (living people)
Commonwealth Games competitors for the Bahamas
Swimmers at the 2018 Commonwealth Games
Swimmers at the 2019 Pan American Games
Male breaststroke swimmers
Pan American Games competitors for the Bahamas